Nenorakam is a 2017 Indian Telugu-language action thriller directed by Sudershan Salendra. The film stars Sairam Shankar and Reshmi Menon with Sarath Kumar in a supporting role. This was one of the last of films of noted comedian M. S. Narayana and released two years after his death. This film performed better than Shankar's previous films.

Cast 
Sairam Shankar as Gautam
Reshmi Menon as Swecha 
Sarath Kumar as Sarath
Adithya Menon
Y. Kasi Viswanath 
Prudhvi
Viva Harsha
Thagubothu Ramesh
Madhunandan
Sudigali Sudheer as Sudheer
M. S. Narayana (Cameo appearance)

Release 
Sify gave the film a rating of two-and-three quarters out of five stars and noted that "Nenorakam entertains here and there. Sarathkumar's character surprise will have its takers. The screenplay could have been much better towards the climax. Lack of intensity and pre-interval scenes are dampener". The Times of India gave the film a rating of two out of five stars and stated that "The film is a story of two halves, and the second half is definitely worth a watch for its cinematography and plot twists".

References

External links 

Indian action thriller films
2017 action thriller films
2010s Telugu-language films